Note: This ship should not be confused with the third USS Resolute (SP-1309) or fifth USS Resolute (SP-3003), which were in commission at the same time.

The fourth USS Resolute (SP-3218) was a tug that served in the United States Navy in 1919.

Resolute was built as a wooden-hulled commercial tug in 1906 at Mobile, Alabama. She was ordered purchased from her owner, John Emile Dredging Company of Jacksonville, Florida, on 8 August 1918 for World War I service in the U.S. Navy. The war had ended by the time she was commissioned as USS Resolute (SP-3218) on 14 January 1919.

Resolute performed local patrol and minesweeping duties within the Parris Island, South Carolina, Section Patrol area, operating from Port Royal, South Carolina.

On 31 May 1919, Resolute was transferred to the United States Marine Corps at Parris Island. On 21 April 1920, she was sold to West India Steamship Company of New York City, for which she served through at least 1926. No records are available regarding her operations or fate after 1926.

References

NavSource Online: Section Patrol Craft Photo Archive Resolute (SP 3218)

Tugs of the United States Navy
Patrol vessels of the United States Navy
Ships built in Mobile, Alabama
1906 ships
Minesweepers of the United States Navy